Yeison Stiven Gordillo Vargas (born 25 June 1992) is a  Colombian professional footballer who plays as a defensive midfielder for Atlético Junior.

Club career

Boyacá Chicó 
With Boyacá Chicó he played 169 matches becoming the seventh player with most caps in the club; he stood out as one of the best players and was seen as one of the players in the Colombian league with the brightest future.

Independiente Santa Fe 
In 2015, he arrived at Independiente Santa Fe where he hoped to make a name for himself. He started as a substitute but earned a spot in the starting eleven, becoming a key player in the team.

Style of play
Gordillo is a hard-working player, one of his traits is breaking down opposition play by chasing them down; he is also known for his leadership in the field.

Career statistics

Club

1 Includes Recopa Sudamericana and Suruga Bank Championship.

Honours

Club 
Santa Fe
Copa Sudamericana : 2015

References

1992 births
Living people
Colombian footballers
Colombian expatriate footballers
Association football midfielders
Sportspeople from Cauca Department
Boyacá Chicó F.C. footballers
Independiente Santa Fe footballers
Deportes Tolima footballers
San Lorenzo de Almagro footballers
Atlético Junior footballers
Categoría Primera A players
Argentine Primera División players
Colombian expatriate sportspeople in Argentina
Expatriate footballers in Argentina